Mecodema dunnorum is a large-bodied ground beetle in the Mecodema genus found in some native forest remnants (e.g., Remiger's Bush Scenic Reserve and Dunn's Bush Scenic Reserve) in the Puhoi area, north Auckland, New Zealand. It is one of six endemic Mecodema species that are found in the Auckland entomological region, as per Crosby et al. 1976.

This beetle was named after Val Dunn and her late husband Arthur Dunn for their conservation work in the Puhoi-Warkworth areas of north Auckland. Both the bush reserves were covenanted by the Dunn family so that there were native forest remnants south of the Puhoi River.

Identification 
Differing from other North Island Mecodema species by the: 

 vertexal groove shallow, more impressed laterally, unpunctured, but large dimples laterally; 
 prothoracic carina broad the entire length, smooth with 14–17 setae along each side; 
 distinctive shape of apical portion of the penis lobe.

Natural history 
Further research is required.

References 

Beetles of New Zealand
dunnorum
Beetles described in 2019